"Stuff" is a song recorded by American country music group Diamond Rio.  It was released in May 2000 as the first single from the album One More Day.  The song reached #36 on the Billboard Hot Country Singles & Tracks chart.  The song was written by Kelly Garrett and Tim Owens.

Content
Rick Cohoon of Allmusic described the song as "a fun yet insightful tune about how we tend to measure our success in life by how many material things we accumulate."

Chart performance

References

2000 singles
2000 songs
Songs written by Tim Owens
Arista Nashville singles
Songs written by Kelly Garrett (songwriter)
Songs about consumerism